Albert Patrick Connelly (April 22, 1909 – July 2, 1990) was a Canadian left winger in the NHL. He played for the New York Rangers and the Chicago Black Hawks. He was born in Montreal, Quebec.

Playing career
Although his NHL career was brief, (1935 –1938) he had a long career both before and after his NHL service. From 1929–1931 he played for 3 teams in Montreal's MCHL the Montreal Eurekas, the Montreal CNR, and the Montreal Columbus. He later played for the Verdun CPR, and the Moncton Hawks. The Hawks won 2 Allan Cups during his time with the team.

In 1935 he finally got his chance in the NHL when he was signed by the New York Rangers. He played with the Rangers for 2 seasons. He played the 1937 season with the Philadelphia Ramblers of the IAHL. He began the next season with the Springfield Indians. Midway through the 1938 season, he was picked up by the Chicago Black Hawks. He helped the team win the Stanley Cup that spring.

After his Stanley Cup triumph with the Chicago Black Hawks his NHL career was over. He remained an active player in the minor leagues until 1946 when he retired from hockey. He died in 1990 in Montreal, Quebec.

Numbers
Wore Uniform # 15 for the New York Rangers.
Wore Uniform # 18 for the Chicago Black Hawks.

References

External links
Career Stats
New York Rangers Biography

1909 births
1990 deaths
Anglophone Quebec people
Canadian ice hockey left wingers
Chicago Blackhawks players
Fort Worth Rangers players
Ice hockey people from Montreal
Moncton Hawks players
New York Rangers players
Stanley Cup champions